Gastón Suárez (born January 27, 1929 – November 6, 1984) was a Bolivian novelist and dramatist. Suárez was born in the town of Tupiza in the southern part of Potosí, Bolivia in 1929.

A self-taught writer, Suárez abandoned elementary school at third grade, following a traumatizing event in which his teacher suffered an epilepsy attack while reading for him. Ironically, his mother, who was also a rural teacher, accepted to home-school him. When he was ten, after reading Dick Sand, A Captain at Fifteen by Jules Verne and Jerry of the Islands by Jack London he promised and swore himself to become, some day, a writer.

By the end of the 1950s he decides to fulfill his promise. He quits his job as a banking employee from the Bolivian Mining Bank and buys a truck to travel and know his country in depth. Throughout almost two years of long trips all over Bolivia, he writes simultaneously several of his short stories and finalizes the first draft of his play Vértigo. A few months later he decides to dedicate fully to write literature and make a living out of it.

He performed diverse activities: railroader, rural teacher, miner, bank employee, truck driver, journalist, etc. He had the opportunity to live and feel the Bolivian life in its diverse social layers. This is reflected with a particular vision in the subjects he writes most about: urban life, the country and the mines.

"... Suárez goes beyond the simple fact and further than the anecdote. He subtly unveils transcendental situations. Acute observer of the human behavior, he is the most outstanding writer of psychological introversion amongst the boom of Bolivian narrators."

His first work was a story book titled "A vigil for the last trip" (Vigilia para el último viaje), from which "Illuminated" (Iluminado) was extracted to be included in several anthologies of Latin American writers, as a remarkable example of brief narration.

Amongst his works also stands out "The Gesture" (El Gesto) another book of short stories from which  "The stranger and the silver candelabrum (El forastero y el candelabro de plata)" and "The diary of Mafalda" (El diario de Mafalda) are the most outstanding.

In 1967, Suárez published his first piece for theatre, Vértigo, a drama of social and philosophical depth that depicts the life of a man being freed after twenty years in prison and his efforts to gather his seven children who have all taken different paths in life. Vertigo was screenplayed and presented in Jornadas Julianas de la Juventud in 1967, winning the first prize.

His most famous novel is Mallko, published in 1974. It narrates the life of a humanized Condor ("a Mallko" as it is named in the Amerindian language Aymara). The novel has elements of fiction and magic realism, but ends up being much more than that. It is at the same time a vivid, real and crude narration of the life of the Andean man. It is a philosophical reflection on the man's faith of meeting his own destiny and the need to survive in isolation and constant need. It is virtually a compulsory text in Bolivia, Spain and in the signatory countries of the Andean Zone.  In 1976 Mallko was included in the Honour List of the Hans Christian Andersen Award and described as "an exceptional example of literature with international importance".

In 1979, the International Year of the Child, he published another novel The adventures of Miguelín Quijano (Las aventuras de Miguelín Quijano), in which he works with metaphors and references with respect to the quixotic characters to obtain a beautiful parable that ignites the creative imagination of the children and incites their interest for the immortal book of Miguel de Cervantes.

In 1981 he published Beyond the Winter (Despues del Invierno), a drama portraying the dilemma of two brothers (Melitón and Benjamin) facing the decision of staying and caring their old ailing father or to go on with their own lives.

Suárez died in the city of La Paz in November 1984, the victim of a sudden heart failure.

Bibliography
1964 – The gesture (El Gesto)
1966 – A vigil for the last trip (Vigilia para el último viaje)
1967 – Vértigo
1969 – The girl from Hamburg (La muchacha de Hamburgo)
1974 – Mallko 
1979 – The adventures of Miguelin Quijano (Las aventuras de Miguelín Quijano)
1980 – Beyond the winter (Después del Invierno)

References

External links
 www.gastonsuarez.org
 www.mallko.com
 www.librosbolivianos.com
 www.bolivianbooks.com

1929 births
1984 deaths
People from Sud Chichas Province
Bolivian male writers
20th-century Bolivian writers